Ingush State University is a public university in Magas, Republic of Ingushetia. It was founded in 1994 and considered to be one of the youngest public universities in Russia. With 10 faculties and 42 academic departments the university is the biggest higher education institution in the region.

History 

Shortly after a partition of Chechen-Ingush ASSR and establishment the Republic of Ingushetia on June 4, 1992, the newly (re)created federal region was in urge of founding new higher education institution, which would gradually become the main university of the republic. In April, 1994, by the Government of Russia decree the Ingush State University has been created, founded by Russian Federation State Committee for Higher Education.

The university started functioning in September 1994, in one of the buildings of former barracks  of Stavropol aviation school in Sunzha. After almost 10 years since the establishment, the Ingush State University has campuses in the main cities of Ingushetiya -  Nazran, Sunzha and Magas, with newly built  research labs and dorms.

Faculties 

 Faculty of Philology 
 Faculty of Economics
 Faculty of Economics and Finance
 Faculty of Law
 Faculty of History
 Faculty of Medicine
 Faculty Chemistry and Biology
 Faculty of Physics and Mathematics 
 Faculty of Agricultural Engineering 
 Faculty of  Pedagogy

Academic cooperation 

Ingush State University collaborates with numerous Russian and international higher  education institutions and research centers, such as:

 Moscow State University
 Herzen University
 Financial University under the Government of the Russian Federation
 
 Tyumen State University
 Max Planck Institute for Evolutionary Anthropology (Leipzig, Germany)
 University of Dresden
 California University of Contemporary Anthropology
 Kazakhstan State endowment "Parasat"

Ingushetia
Public universities and colleges in Russia